Gumma or Guma may refer to:

Places
 Guma (woreda), one of the Districts of Ethiopia in the Oromia region
 Guma, Pishan County, seat and subdivision of Guma (Pishan) County, Xinjiang, China
 Guma, Hebei (zh), subdivision of Luan County, Hebei, China
 Guma County, subdivision of Hotan Prefecture, Xinjiang, China
 Guma, Abkhazia, Georgia
 Guma, India, West Bengal
 Guma railway station, West Bengal, India
 Guma, Nigeria, a Local Government Area of Benue State
 Gumma, Gajapati, Odisha, India
 Gumma, an alternative spelling of Gunma Prefecture in Japan
 The Kingdom of Gumma (also spelled Guma), a former kingdom in the Gibe region of Ethiopia
 Pishan County (Guma), a county in Khotan region of East Turkestan

Other uses
 Gumma (pathology), a characteristic tissue nodule found in the tertiary stage of syphilis